Sir Joseph Scott, 1st Baronet (1752–1828) was an English landowner and politician.

He was the son of William Scott (d. 1753) of Great Barr Hall, then in Staffordshire. In around 1777 he replaced the hall with a new building.

In 1799 he served as High Sheriff of Staffordshire and was member of parliament for Worcester in 1802–1806.

On 30 April 1806 he was created 1st Baronet of the Baronetage Scott of Great Barr.

He married Margaret Whitby by whom he had three children, one daughter Mary who died aged 15 and two sons Edward Dolman Scott who succeeded him in 1828, and William Scott who became Vicar of Great Barr.

References

 The Baronetage of England John Debrett (1839) p 327

External links 
 

1752 births
1828 deaths
Baronets in the Baronetage of the United Kingdom
Members of the Parliament of the United Kingdom for English constituencies
UK MPs 1802–1806
High Sheriffs of Staffordshire
English landowners
Great Barr